2014 Empress's Cup Final was the 36th final of the Empress's Cup competition. The final was played at Tokyo Stadium in Tokyo on January 1, 2015. Nippon TV Beleza won the championship.

Overview
Nippon TV Beleza won their 11th title, by defeating Urawa Reds 1–0 with Mina Tanaka goal.

Match details

See also
2014 Empress's Cup

References

Empress's Cup
2014 in Japanese women's football